Iwalani McCalla (born June 17, 1971) is a Jamaican former professional tennis player.

McCalla has career-high WTA rankings of 347 in singles, achieved on 21 August 1995, and 329 in doubles, set on 24 July 1995. She has won 1 doubles titles on the ITF Women's Circuit. She played college tennis for the UCLA Bruins and partnered with Mamie Ceniza to win the NCAA doubles championship in her senior year in 1992. The pair received wildcards to the main draw of the 1992 US Open.

Playing for Jamaica at the Fed Cup, McCalla has accumulated a win–loss record of 1–3.

ITF finals

Doubles: 2 (1–1)

Fed Cup participation

Singles

Doubles

References

External links
 
 

1971 births
Living people
Jamaican female tennis players
Jamaican sportswomen
UCLA Bruins women's tennis players
Jamaican expatriate sportspeople in the United States